The Europe/Africa Zone was one of the three zones of the regional Davis Cup competition in 1992.

In the Europe/Africa Zone there were three different tiers, called groups, in which teams competed against each other to advance to the upper tier. Winners in Group III advanced to the Europe/Africa Zone Group II in 1993. All other teams remained in Group III.

Participating nations

Draw
 Venue: Tennis Club de Tunis, Tunis, Tunisia
 Date: 29 April–3 May

Results

Tunisia vs. Algeria

Congo vs. Senegal

Cameroon vs. South Africa

Tunisia vs. Senegal

Algeria vs. South Africa

Congo vs. Cameroon

Tunisia vs. Congo

Algeria vs. Cameroon

South Africa vs. Senegal

Tunisia vs. South Africa

Algeria vs. Congo

Cameroon vs. Senegal

Tunisia vs. Cameroon

Algeria vs. Senegal

Congo vs. South Africa

References

External links
Davis Cup official website

Davis Cup Europe/Africa Zone
Europe Africa Zone Group III